Conrad IV of Tann, also "of Thann" or "of Dahn", (died 1236) was the 48th Bishop of Speyer, holding office from 1233 to 1236.

Familial connexions 
Conrad came from the von Dahn family who, as episcopal ministeriales, owned estates in the southern Palatinate. The three castles of the Dahn as well as Neudahn Castle were initially all owned by the family.

Life 

Conrad of Dahn, brother of the castellan, Frederick I of Dahn, was the cathedral canon in Worms, curator (Domkustos) of St. Cyriakus in Worms-Neuhausen, and provost of the chu

Literature 
 Hans Ammerich: Das Bistum Speyer und seine Geschichte, Vol. 2: Von der Stauferzeit (1125) bis zum Beginn des 16. Jahrhunderts; Kehl am Rhein, 1999; . especially pp. 4–6.
 Gatz: Die Bischöfe des Hl. Röm. Reiches 1198-1448, p. 743
 Ludwig Stamer: Kirchengeschichte der Pfalz, Vol. 2; Speyer, 1949
 Sigmund Joseph Zimmern: Artikel Speyer in: Wetzer und Welte’s Kirchenlexikon oder Encyklopädie der katholischen Theologie und ihrer Hülfswissenschaften, Vol. 11; Freiburg: Herder’sche Verlagsbuchhandlung, 1882–1903; col. 596

External links 
 Bishop Conrad IV of Tann in the Saarland Biographies

References 

13th-century Roman Catholic bishops in Bavaria
Roman Catholic bishops of Speyer
1236 deaths
Year of birth unknown